Zoro (stylized as ZORO) was a Japanese Visual Kei rock band formed in January 2007. Though they were originally a four-piece band for four years, as of 2011, the band is a duo consisting of vocalist Ryuuji and bassist Tatsuhi.

History
Vocalist Ryuuji, bassist Tatsuhi, and drummer Yuuya were previously part of a band called Soroban. After Soroban disbanded, the three went on to form the band Zoro in January 2007. Their first performance was at Liquidroom Ebisu on March 5, 2007, although they did not have a drummer. Taizo later joined Zoro in June 2007 after the disbandment of his previous band, Mouse.

On December 27, 2010, at Maverick DC Group's annual concert Jack in the Box 2010, Zoro revealed that Yuuya and Taizo would be leaving the band and that the band would go on a hiatus. Their last performance together was held at C.C.Lemon Hall on December 29, 2010. During the performance, vocalist Ryuuji declared to the audience that he and Tatsuhi would continue Zoro as a duo. The band later departed from Maverick DC Group's record label, Danger Crue Records.

In July 2011, the band announced that they would be resuming activities while still in search of a new guitarist and drummer. With their return, they launched a new independent record label, Jesse Records, and released a new single. They also embarked on a solo tour in the following months.

Past members
  - vocalist (2007–2015)
  - bassist (2007–2015)
  – drummer (2007–2010)
  - guitarist (2007–2010), currently in Kra

Discography

Full Albums

Mini-Albums

Singles

Promotional videos

References

External links
 

Gan-Shin artists
Japanese indie rock groups
Visual kei musical groups
Japanese rock music groups

Musical groups established in 2007